The 2018–19 season is Vitosha Bistritsa's second consecutive season in the Bulgarian First League after they won play-offs against Pirin Blagoevgrad (0:1 home loss and 2:1 away win with goals of Radko Mutafchiyski and Grigor Dolapchiev and Lokomotiv Sofia (2:2 after extra time with goals by Daniel Kutev and Stefan Hristov, and 4:2 after penalties).

Squad

Fixtures

Regular season

Relegation stage

Relegation play-offs

Bulgarian Cup

Squad statistics

|-
|colspan="10"|Players who left Vitosha Bistritsa during the season:

|}

References 

 
 Vitosha - Lokomitiv Sofia 2:2 (4:2 after penalties)

Vitosha
FC Vitosha Bistritsa seasons